Deborah Willis (born February 5, 1948) is a contemporary African-American artist, photographer, curator of photography, photographic historian, author, and educator. Among her awards and honors, she is a 2000 MacArthur Fellow. She is currently Professor and Chair of the Department of Photography and Imaging at Tisch School of the Arts of New York University.

Early life and education 
Deborah Willis was born in Philadelphia, Pennsylvania to Ruth and Thomas Willis on February 5, 1948. Willis is the mother of conceptual artist Hank Willis Thomas. Her father was a photographer as well, and her close familial ties are apparent in works such as Daddy's Ties: The Tie Quilt II (1992), and Progeny: Deborah Willis and Hank Willis Thomas (2009).

Wilis' degrees include a B.F.A. in photography from Philadelphia College of Art in 1975; an M.F.A. in photography from Pratt Institute in 1979; an M.A. in art history from City College of New York in 1986; and a Ph.D. from the Cultural Studies Program of George Mason University in 2001.

Career 
During her early career, Deborah Willis sought to find and recognize photography created by African Americans. She also aims to document and portray the beauty of the female body through her works. With the help of Richard Newman from Garland Publishing, she was able to create her first book “Black Photographers, 1840-1940: an Illustrated Bio-bibliography” (1985), which included over three hundred photographers in the book. As she described in an interview, many of the photographers were ready to throw out their work due to lack of recognition before the book. Continuing with her goal of recognizing black photographers, Deborah Willis came out with a second installment called “An Illustrated Bio-Bibliography of Black Photographers, 1940-1988” (1989) which also included contemporary photographers, as she previously intended to in the first installment.

Willis was the curator of photographs and the prints/exhibition coordinator at the Schomburg Center for Research in Black Culture at the New York Public Library between 1980 and 1992, after which she became exhibitions curator at the Center for African American History and Culture of the Smithsonian Institution for eight years. Between 2000 and 2001 she was Lehman Brady Visiting Joint Chair Professor in Documentary Studies and American Studies at Duke University and the University of North Carolina at Chapel Hill. She then joined the faculty of New York University as a professor of photography and imaging in the Tisch School of Arts, eventually become the chair of that department. Interested in "historic and cultural documentation and preservation," she has published "some twenty books on African-American photographers and on the representation of blacks in photographic imagery." Among them are Reflections in Black: A History of Black Photographers 1840 to the Present (2002), Posing Beauty: African American Images from the 1890s to the Present (2009), and Black: A Celebration of a Culture (2014). Also known as "Deb Willis," she survived a diagnosis of breast cancer in 2001. She was the curator of photographs and the prints/exhibition coordinator at the Schomburg Center for Research in Black Culture at the New York Public Library between 1980 and 1992.

Willis co-produced the 2014 documentary film Through a Lens Darkly: Black Photographers and the Emergence of a People, which is based on her book Reflections in Black: A History of Black Photographers 1840 to the Present. In 2008, she organized the exhibition Let Your Motto Be Resistance: African American Portraits for the National Museum of African American History and Culture of the Smithsonian Institution.

Willis' work was included in the 2015 exhibition We Speak: Black Artists in Philadelphia, 1920s-1970s at the Woodmere Art Museum.

Awards and honors 
Willis has received numerous awards and honors, including:
2020 Award for Outstanding Service to Photography and Honorary Fellowship of the Royal Photographic Society.
 2013-2014: Richard D. Cohen Fellow in African and African American Art, Hutchins Center for African and African American Research, Harvard University
2005: Guggenheim Fellow, John Simon Guggenheim Memorial Foundation
 2005: Fletcher Fellow, Fletcher Foundation
 2003: Honorary doctorate, Maryland Institute College of Art
 2000: MacArthur Fellow
 1995: Infinity Award for Writing, International Center of Photography.

Artistic and photographic works 

As an artist and photographer, Willis was represented by Bernice Steinbaum Gallery in Miami and Charles Guice Contemporary in Berkeley, California.  Her exhibitions have included:
 "Progeny," Bernice Steinbaum Gallery, Miami, 2008.  The exhibition traveled as "Progeny: Deborah Willis and Hank Willis Thomas" in 2009 to New York and to Sacramento, California.
 "Regarding Beauty", University of Wisconsin–Madison, 2003, containing "photographs and autobiographical quilts."
 "Deborah Willis: Tied to Memory," Kemper Museum of Contemporary Art, Kansas City, 2000.
 "Deborah Willis," Hughley Gallery & Objects, Atlanta, 1992, involving "small narrative quilts built around historical photographs, documents and family snapshots."

Willis is also a quilter, also incorporating photographic images into her pieces. Daddy's Ties: The Tie Quilt II from 1992 (27 x 34"), for example, is a fabric collage with added button, tie clips, and pins forming "a supple, irregularly shaped memorial." The work references multiple generations and genders, as it elicits memories of fathers teaching their sons, boys maturing into adult clothes and rituals, and women adjusting their husbands' knots. At the same time, however, the artist's cutting and reconfiguration of the ties raises the possibility that such nostalgic references might be outmoded or rejected. This multivalent collage "also memorializes black soldiers who fought in World War II," since Willis includes photos of soldiers on linen fabric collaged onto the tie fabric. Willis's focus on the African-American experience is evident in Tribute to the Hottentot Venus: Bustle (1995), a fabric and photo linen collage (23 x 28") in a triptych format. Small images of Saartjie Baartman, the so-called "Hottentot Venus," appear in the left and right sections together with pieced fabric silhouettes of her body. The central image in the triptych is of a late 19th-century dress with prominent bustle, its shape emphasizing the buttocks. Willis explains that her use of quilting as a technique "reminds us who we are and who and what our ancestors have been to us in the larger society."

Her quilts have been included in the following exhibits and catalogs:
 "Story Quilts: Photography and Beyond", Black Gallery, Los Angeles, CA, 1999, Curated by photographer and installation artist Pat Ward Williams, the exhibition showcased the works of three African-American artists—Willis, Kyra E. Hicks and Dorothy Taylor.
 Tribute to the Hottentot Venus quilt, 1992.

Curated exhibitions

Exhibitions that Willis has curated include:

 "Posing Beauty in African American Culture," which opened Fall 2009 at the Tisch School of the Arts, New York University, and is currently a touring worldwide.
 "Reflections in Black," Arts and Industries Building, Smithsonian Institution, Washington, DC, 2000, on African-American photography. The exhibition in whole or in part traveled widely in the U.S. between 2000 and 2003.
 "Constructed Images: New Photography," which traveled between 1989 and 1992.

Publications

References

Further reading

External links 

 
 Berger, Maurice, ""Framing - and - Reflecting Beauty", Lens Blog, The New York Times, March 11, 2013, 

Finley, Cheryl, "Deborah Willis’s Writings and Exhibitions Have Shaped Scholarship on African-American Photography", ARTnews, January 14, 2020.
Stuart A. Rose Manuscript, Archives, and Rare Book Library, Emory University: "Carl Van Vechten: American Portraitist" exhibit materials, 1992 (curated by Deborah Willis)
Deborah Willis professional files collection held by the New York Public Library Archives and Manuscripts Division

African-American contemporary artists
American contemporary artists
American photographers
African-American photographers
Photography curators
American art historians
Women art historians
City College of New York alumni
George Mason University alumni
MacArthur Fellows
New York University faculty
Artists from Philadelphia
Pratt Institute alumni
University of the Arts (Philadelphia) alumni
1948 births
Living people
American women historians
American women printmakers
Quilters
Historians from Pennsylvania
21st-century American women photographers
21st-century American photographers
African-American printmakers
21st-century African-American women
21st-century African-American artists
20th-century African-American people
20th-century African-American women
American women curators
American curators